The IDF Military Colleges is a centralized educational unit of the Israeli Defence Forces under the command of the General Staff. Since 2019 its commander is aluf Itai Veruv.

It was established in 1991 by merging Israeli military colleges into a single unit.  The first commander was Yossi Ben Hanan. 

Location

It is located at Dayan Camp,   near Ramat Hasharon. 

In 2010 a decision was approved to evacuate most of the Glilot camp complex, with the expensive land repurposed as residential area. Since 2002 there were different suggestions for the future location of the Military Colleges camp by Jerusalem. However no consensus between the IDF and civil organizations was reached for a long time.  In August 2019 despite the appeals the location of 39 dunam (9.75 acres) in area  within the government-owned public land was approved in the Jerusalem Forest at the Terrace Hill near the Ein Kerem neighborhood of Jerusalem and the Israel Elwyn Center (the latter location is still referred by its former name "Swedish Village" ).

References

External links
Official website 

Israel Defense Forces
Military education and training in Israel
Educational institutions established in 1991